Arthur Housam (1 October 1917 – 31 December 1975) was an English professional footballer who played as a wing half for Sunderland.

References

1917 births
1975 deaths
Footballers from Sunderland
English footballers
Association football wing halves
Sunderland A.F.C. players
Darlington Town F.C. players
English Football League players